Bharatiya Vidya Bhavan, Taliparamba Kendra (BVB Tpba) is a senior secondary school affiliated to the Central Board of Secondary Education (CBSE), New Delhi. Established in 1999, it is a part of the Bharatiya Vidya Bhavan, a group of India's premier educational institutions, and is situated in Mahatma Udyan, Taliparamba, Kannur District, Kerala.

History 
BVB Tpba was founded in 1999 on 8.5 acres of land in Taliparamba Taluk. The school functions under the purview of the Taliparamba Kendra of Bharatiya Vidya Bhavan. Sri. P C Vijayarajan is the Chairman of the Kendra.

School motto
The motto of the school is "Aa no badraaha kartavyo yanthu vishwatahah" (devanagari: आः नो भद्राः कर्तव्यो यन्तु विश्वतः) which translates into English as "Let Noble thoughts come to us from every side".

References

External links
 Official website

High schools and secondary schools in Kerala
Schools affiliated with the Bharatiya Vidya Bhavan
Educational institutions established in 1999
1999 establishments in Kerala
Schools in Kannur district